Gizzie Dorbor (born 28 February 1987) is a Liberian footballer (defender) playing currently for F.C. Tzeieri Kafr Kanna. He is also a member of the Liberia national football team. He made his international debut against Mali in Bamako when Liberia lost 4-1 (World Cup Qualifiers 2005). Dorbor main position is as a left back. He can also play as a central back and as a central midfielder.

International career

International goals
Scores and results list Liberia's goal tally first.

References

External links 
 
 

1987 births
Living people
Liberian footballers
Mighty Barrolle players
LISCR FC players
Maccabi Ironi Bat Yam F.C. players
Hapoel Herzliya F.C. players
Hapoel Kfar Saba F.C. players
Hapoel Afula F.C. players
F.C. Tzeirei Kafr Kanna players
Liga Leumit players
Liberia international footballers
Liberian expatriate footballers
Expatriate footballers in Israel
Liberian expatriate sportspeople in Israel
Association football defenders